Netkachevo is a rural locality (a selo) in Mokroolkhovskoye Rural Settlement, Kotovsky District, Volgograd Oblast, Russia. The population was 83 as of 2010. There are 2 streets.

Geography 
Netkachevo is located in steppe, on Volga Upland, 41 km northeast of Kotovo (the district's administrative centre) by road. Kryachki is the nearest rural locality.

References 

Rural localities in Kotovsky District